John Gabriel Anrep (December 4, 1821 – March 12, 1907) was a Swedish genealogist and author.

Biography
He was born on December 4, 1821, at Lekeberg Municipality on the family farm. He moved to Stockholm and was involved in genealogical publishing. He is best known for his history of Swedish nobility in 4 volumes. It was Sweden's first scholarly genealogical work. From 1871 to 1882 he published another set of genealogy books, and the 1900s edition was edited by Gustaf Elgenstierna. In 1854 he started a new set in 27 volumes, containing information up to 1903. He died on March 12, 1907, in Stockholm, Sweden.

Anrep's nobility genealogy
Gillingstam presents documentation that Anrep had personally discarded a lot of earlier parts of family trees of the nobility, for example as being mythical. However, in his series 1858–1864, Nobility Genealogy, 4 volumes, it was a prerequisite from the House of Nobility that in order to use their material, Anrep must follow those (even mythical parts of) family tables strictly – i.e., he was not allowed to discard mythical parts of the pompous pedigrees in his publication. This has been used as criticism against Anrep personally – that he published even mistaken genealogies. Also, his publication has been used as evidence of the truthfulness of those mythical parts of genealogies, on basis of Anrep's authority – although he might personally be appalled to see his name used for such purpose, having himself left personal notes about unreliable portions.

Publication
Svenska adelns Ättar-taflor utgifna

References

1821 births
1907 deaths
Swedish male writers
Swedish genealogists
Swedish non-fiction writers
Male non-fiction writers